The Strands Series is a series of books and short stories written by Gael Baudino between 1981 and 1994 and published between 1989 and 1997.  The majority of the plot occurs in a fictional land named Adria, which is based on Medieval Western Europe, with parts of later books occurring in 1990s Denver, USA.  Though many of the locations in Adria are fictional, the geography, culture, and language are realistic depictions of Europe during the 14th-15th centuries.  The author describes Adria's placement in this way: "Imagine a slash between France and Germany, and then insert about 300 miles".  

The story arc takes place against the backdrop of historical events such as: the Medieval Inquisition by the Catholic church; the Crusades; the Western Schism; the fading of feudalism and the concomitant rise of a prosperous commerce-driven middle class; the Black Death plagues; the introduction of cannon into European warfare; and in the later books, contemporary urban decay.

Books
Strands of Starlight - Book 1, 1989
Maze of Moonlight - Book 2, 1993
Shroud of Shadow - Book 3, 1994
Strands of Sunlight - Book 4, 1994
Spires of Spirit - A collection of short stories in the Strands universe, 1997

Plot summary
In the broadest view, the Strands series deals with the immortal Elves, who have been around since the forming of the world, and their interactions with humans.  They are immortal in the sense that they don't die of old age or disease (the eldest of them is roughly four and one half billion years old), though they can be killed or die from grief.  The purpose of the Elves is to provide "aid and comfort" to all living things, but especially their beloved human cousins.  Against this urge to help, they find themselves feared, hated, and persecuted by humans because of their immortality and extra-human, nearly godlike, powers of prescience, manipulation of the future, healing, and control over physical items. 

Over time, they have faded, for multiple reasons: they reproduce very seldom; some have chosen to fade from the earth due to grief or personal loss; and they have been persecuted by humans.  Likewise, their powers are waning with the passing of time. In 1500 CE, they disappear entirely, but their bloodlines remain, due to interbreeding with humans over the years.  Hundreds of years later, in the 1990s, the blood suddenly starts manifesting itself in certain people.  What becomes of them after the 1990s has never been fleshed out by the author.

Physical aspects of the Elves
Physically, Elves are similar to humans, with the only obvious difference being their slightly pointed ears, which they often conceal by growing their hair long and using it to cover their ears when they wish to pass undetected.  Male elves tend to have slighter builds than typical human men, with no facial hair at all; they are often described by the author as having a nearly womanly cast to their faces.  Female elves tend to be slightly taller than typical human females, with the net result being that male and female elves are very similar in size and build to each other. 

All Elves possess graceful and strong bodies as well as perfect health.  They are very difficult to kill, often continuing on after receiving wounds that would kill a human.  Humans seeing them for the first time often assume they are trained in the martial arts, due to their extreme coordination and sense of being at ease with their bodies.  Temperature extremes do not affect them, and they do not sweat when hot (the author originally had them sweating in the 1985 short story The Shadow of the Starlight, but changed it for the book series).  They view all activities they engage in as smaller parts of the greater pattern of things, and because of this and their long life span, they attain a level of excellence that no human can match in whatever skills they pursue.

As a consequence of their perception of the patterns of reality, they can discern things about the physical realm that are hidden from humans.  Their senses are superhumanly keen, with extraordinarily sharp hearing and sight that is not affected by darkness.  Elves and those with elven blood can often see a silvery sheen surrounding other elves and those with elvish blood, especially when their powers are active.  When walking, they usually make no sound at all, even when they are in a hurry or their feet are encumbered.

Powers of the Elves
The Elves' powers are described in terms of the Elves' awareness of and influence over the patterns of reality, much in the same vein as the Moirai of Greek myth.  They can discern the patterns of cause and effect in a very real and palpable manner, and they can selectively re-weave the patterns to suit their desires, though it greatly drains them if the manipulation is in-depth or far-sweeping; they are also aware of the principle of unintended consequences, where a little meddling in the present can yield large and potentially disastrous results later.

In practice, the Elves can change reality in nearly any way, the extent and means being limited only by their conscience, force of will, and energy given to the task.  Some examples are: healing anything short of death; changing humans into animals, other humans, or Elves; seeing into the many possible futures or the distant past; changing massive items like castles into solid rock; seeing in the dark; mastering an instrument or weapon beyond any human's abilities; speaking with animals and plants; and changing aspects of a human's personality like fearlessness, happiness, intelligence, musical aptitude, aggression, etc.

Story and character arcs
The super-arc of the Aurverelle's feud with the elves.  Aurverelle's men kill the elf Mirya three hundred years before Strands of Starlight.  Terrill and Varden avenge her by slaughtering the men of Aurverelle.  Later, Baron Roger continues the Aurverelle ways and rapes Miriam.  Varden, seeing his and Terrill's connection to Roger's actions, heals Miriam, who later becomes elven and drastically changes the path of the Aurverelle house.  Two generations later, in Maze of Moonlight, Christopher of Aurverelle joins the Crusades to atone for his family's perceived failure.  He returns a damaged man.  Terrill, Mirya, and Natil, knowing their collective responsibility for his fate, come to aid as they can.  They heal the young seer he has taken in, an action which eventually turns her elven.  In defending Saint Brigid from mercenaries, they lay the foundation for it being eventually deserted.
The repeated infusion of starlight into Charity: when she was reborn from the Leather Woman; when Varden and Roxanne dissolved the barriers in Charity's mind between her past and present lives; when she was healed by Miriam in the forest; when she was healed by Miriam after being ridden down by Cranby.  She becomes more than human, but less than elven.
Roxanne and Varden's child, Lake, is half-elven.  Lake's wife, Miriam, is the girl whose mother was healed by Mirya in Strands of Starlight.  Their daughter, Vanessa, is plagued by visions of the webs of probability and later becomes mostly Elven.
The transformation of Alban into a pig.  His departure opens the way for the blacksmith's son, Kay to become priest in Saint Brigid.  Later, Alban's attack on George Darci brings him and Terrill together.

See also
Wire-strung harps

Citations

Fantasy books by series